Albert Henry Vestal (January 18, 1875 – April 1, 1932) was an American lawyer and politician who served eight terms as a Republican United States Representative from Indiana from 1917 to 1932.

Biography
Born on a farm near Frankton, in Madison County, Indiana, on January 18, 1875, he attended common schools, worked in steel mills and factories and attended the Indiana State Normal School, now Indiana State University, at Terre Haute. He taught school for several years and then graduated from the law department of the Valparaiso University in 1896. Admitted to the bar in 1896, Vestal commenced practicing law in Anderson, Indiana.

Early career 
He was elected prosecuting attorney of the fiftieth judicial circuit and served from 1900 to 1906. He was an unsuccessful candidate for the Republican nomination for Congress in 1908 and an unsuccessful candidate for election in 1914 to the Sixty-fourth Congress.

Congress 
He was finally elected as a Republican to the Sixty-fifth Congress and to seven succeeding Congresses, serving from March 4, 1917, until his death. He was chairman of the committee on Coinage, Weights, and Measures (Sixty-sixth through Sixty-eighth Congresses), Committee on Patents (Sixty-ninth through Seventy-first Congresses); majority whip (Sixty-eighth through Seventy-first Congresses).

Death 
Vestal died in Washington, D.C., on April 1, 1932, and was interred in East Maplewood Cemetery in Anderson.

See also

 List of United States Congress members who died in office (1900–49)

External links

Albert H. Vestal collection at the Indiana State Library

1875 births
1932 deaths
Politicians from Anderson, Indiana
Indiana State University alumni
Valparaiso University alumni
Indiana lawyers
Members of the United States Assay Commission
People from Madison County, Indiana
Republican Party members of the United States House of Representatives from Indiana